Thomas W. Armstrong (August 22, 1858 – July 23, 1927) was a Canadian-born American businessman and politician who served as a member of the Wisconsin State Assembly from 1916 to 1918.

Early life 
Born in Brampton, Ontario, Armstrong emigrated to the United States with his parents and settled in Glenbeulah, Wisconsin. He attended Glenbeulah public schools.

Career 
Armstrong began his career as a railroad brakeman and conductor. In 1898, Armstrong opened a buffet in Kaukauna, Wisconsin. He served on the Kaukauna Common Council and the Kaukauna Utility Commission. From 1916 to 1918, Armstrong served in the Wisconsin State Assembly as a Republican.

Death 
Armstrong died in Green Bay, Wisconsin of complications from surgery.

Notes

External links

1858 births
1927 deaths
Canadian emigrants to the United States
Politicians from Brampton
People from Kaukauna, Wisconsin
People from Glenbeulah, Wisconsin
Businesspeople from Ontario
Businesspeople from Wisconsin
Wisconsin city council members
Republican Party members of the Wisconsin State Assembly